Philadelphia Seaplane Base  is a township-owned, public-use seaplane base located one nautical mile (1.85 km) south of the central business district of Essington, a community in Tinicum Township, Delaware County, Pennsylvania, United States. It is situated on the Delaware River, west of Philadelphia International Airport.

Originally, the facility operated during World War I as Chandler Field.

Facilities and aircraft 
It has one seaplane landing area designated 11/29 which measures 9,100 by 250 feet (2,774 x 76 m). For the 12-month period ending September 16, 2008, it had 4,500 general aviation aircraft operations, an average of 12 per day.

References

External links 
 Philadelphia Seaplane Base, official site
 Aerial photo as of 24 April 1999 from USGS The National Map

Airports in Pennsylvania
Seaplane bases in the United States
Transportation buildings and structures in Delaware County, Pennsylvania